King Edward Avenue may refer to:

King Edward Avenue (Vancouver)
King Edward Avenue (Ottawa)
King Edward Street, Oxford